Pseudoacontias angelorum is a species of skink, a lizard in the family Scincidae. The species is endemic to Madagascar.

Etymology
The specific name, angelorum (masculine, genitive, plural), is in honor of twin brothers Angelien and Angeluc Razafimanantsoa who are Malagasy naturalists.

Geographic range
P. angelorum is found in northeastern Madagascar.

Habitat
The preferred natural habitat of P. angelorum is primary rainforest.

Description
P. angelorum has no front legs, and its back legs are flap-like and styliform.

Reproduction
The mode of reproduction of P. angelorum is unknown.

References

Further reading
Glaw F, Vences M (2006). A Field Guide to the Amphibians and Reptiles of Madagascar, Third Edition. Cologne, Germany: Vences & Glaw Verlag. 496 pp. .
Nussbaum RA, Raxworthy CJ (1995). "Review of the Scincine Genus Pseudoacontias Barboza du Bocage (Reptilia: Squamata: Scincidae) of Madagascar". Herpetologica 51 (1): 91–99. (Pseudoacontias angelorum, new species).

Reptiles described in 1995
Pseudoacontias
Taxa named by Christopher John Raxworthy
Taxa named by Ronald Archie Nussbaum